Rhamphus is a genus of beetles belonging to the family Curculionidae.

The species of this genus are found in Europe, Japan and Australia.

Species:
 Rhamphus oxyacanthae
 Rhamphus pulicarius

References

Curculionidae
Curculionidae genera